Cottown is the name of several hamlets and villages in Aberdeenshire, Scotland:

One located at 
One located at 
One located at 
One located at

References

Villages in Aberdeenshire